The 2019 Malaysia M4 League (Malay: 2019 Liga M4 Malaysia) is the inaugural season of the League competition since its establishment in 2019. It is in the fourth tier of the Malaysia football league system. The league has several leagues registered under it.

Liga Melaka Division 1

Group A

Group B

KLFA Super League

Liga THB-KFA

North Zone 
</noinclude> South Zone <noinclude>

Subang Football League

Terengganu Amateur League

Super League

Premier League

TAL Cup

Quarter-final

Semi-final

Final

MAHSA M4 League

Alumni M4 LeaguePuchong Community LeagueShah Amateur LeagueSelangor Social Premier League<noinclude>

Knockout stage

Quarter-finals

|}

Semi-finals

|}

Final

!colspan=3|26 November 2019

|}

Sultan Johor Cup
Group A
<noinclude>

Group B
<noinclude>

Group C
<noinclude>

Quarter-finals 

!colspan=4|15 November 2019

|}

Semi-finals 

!colspan=3|20 November 2019

|}

Final 

!colspan=3|27 November 2019

|}

Perlis Amateur League
Group A

<noinclude>

Group B
<noinclude>

Group C
<noinclude>

Quarter-finals 

!colspan=3|27 October 2019

|-
!colspan=3|2 November 2019

|-
!colspan=3|3 November 2019

|}

Semi-finals 

!colspan=4|11 November 2019

|}

Final 

!colspan=3|22 November 2019

|}

PBNS Cup

First round

Group A
<noinclude>

Group B
<noinclude>

Group C
<noinclude>

Group D
<noinclude>

Group E

<noinclude>

Group F

<noinclude>

Second round

Group A
<noinclude>

Group B
<noinclude>

Group C
<noinclude>

Group D

<noinclude>

Knouck-out stage

Quarter-finals

!colspan=3|14 November 2019

|-
!colspan=3|15 November 2019

|-
!colspan=3|17 November 2019

|-
!colspan=3|18 November 2019

|}

Semi-finals

!colspan=3|21 November 2019

|}

Final

!colspan=3|27 November 2019

|}

Klang Valley M4 League

The FA Cup champions will be eligible for play-off qualification.

Quarter-finals

!colspan=3|5 October 2019

|-
!colspan=3|6 October 2019

|}

Semi-finals

|}

Final

!colspan=3|26 October 2019

|}

Play-off round

Bracket

Knock-out stage

First round
The first round will played on 7 and 8 December 2019 at Rhino Kv Arena.

KSR Kuala Perlis won 7−6 on penalty.

Quarter-finals

AZE won 4−3 on penalty.

Semi-finals

Final

See also
 2019 Malaysia Super League
 2019 Malaysia Premier League
 2019 Malaysia M3 League
 2019 Malaysia FA Cup

References

External links
 Amateur Football League
Shah Alam League
Klang Valley M4 League
Puchong Community League
LigaTHB-KFA
MAHSA M4 League
MUSA
Subang Football League
 Amatur Shah M4 League
Liga Alumni M4
Perlis FA
Terengganu Amateur League
 Sunarize Soccer League
Adiliga Alumni M4 League

4
Malay